Dancea rodriguezensis is a species of air-breathing land snail, terrestrial pulmonate gastropod mollusk in the family Euconulidae, the hive snails. This species is endemic to Mauritius.

References

Dancea
Taxonomy articles created by Polbot
Endemic fauna of Mauritius